In the later years of The Three Stooges shorts, a tactic was used to cut costs by recycling footage from previous shorts. A typical example consists of using wrap-arounds: new footage is used for an opening, old footage is used for the middle, and new footage is used at the end to wrap things up.

One example involves the short Husbands Beware.  Moe and Larry are shown enduring the agony of married life. As such, they feel that Shemp should be married too. They decide to trick him into getting married. Cut to footage from Brideless Groom where Moe falsely tells Shemp he will inherit $500,000 if he is married by the end of the day. Shemp is married, and the short then ends with new footage of Moe and Larry telling Shemp it was all a lie because he let Moe and Larry marry his two overweight sisters and got divorced.

This was mostly done with shorts featuring Shemp Howard as the previous third stooge Curly Howard was no longer involved in production. There are, however, exceptions, especially when Joe Besser came on board, and far-away shots of Curly could sort of pass for a shot of Joe. After Shemp's death in November 1955, four entries even went so far as to use recycled footage, and a double posing as Shemp ("Fake Shemp") in his place.

The following is a list of what shorts were recycled into new shorts, followed by a list of what new shorts used old footage.

Three Stooges

Three Stooges